Bangladesh women's national kabaddi team represents Bangladesh in women's Kabaddi events.

Tournament history

World Cup

Asian Games

South Asian Games

References

Kabaddi
National women's kabaddi teams
Women's national kabaddi team